The Creole darter (Etheostoma collettei) is a species of freshwater ray-finned fish, a darter from the subfamily Etheostomatinae, part of the family Percidae, which also contains the perches, ruffes and pikeperches. It is  endemic to the Eastern United States, where it occurs in the Ouachita, Red, Calcasieu and Sabine River drainages in Arkansas and Louisiana. It inhabits gravel riffles, current-swept vegetation and debris in creeks and small to medium rivers. The creole darter was first formally described in 1969 by Ray S. Bridsong and Leslie William Knapp with the type locality given as the Dugdemona River, Jackson Parish, Louisiana''.

Etymology
The specific name honours of the American ichthyologist Bruce Baden Collette, then of the Bureau of Commercial Fisheries Systematics Labroratory, to recognise his contribution to the study of the fishes of the perch family.

References

Etheostoma
Taxa named by Ray S. Birdsong
Taxa named by Leslie William Knapp
Fish described in 1969